Rita Defauw (born 23 May 1963) is a Belgian rower. She competed in the women's single sculls event at the 1988 Summer Olympics.

References

1963 births
Living people
Belgian female rowers
Olympic rowers of Belgium
Rowers at the 1988 Summer Olympics
Rowers from Ghent